is a Japanese female badminton player. In 2009, she won the Malaysia International Challenge tournament in the women's doubles event partnered with Yu Wakita. In 2010, she and Wakita became the runner-up at the U.S. Open Badminton Championships. In 2017, she won the mixed doubles titles at the China International Challenge tournament partnered with Tomoya Takashina.

Achievements

BWF Grand Prix (1 runner-up) 
The BWF Grand Prix has two level such as Grand Prix and Grand Prix Gold. It is a series of badminton tournaments, sanctioned by Badminton World Federation (BWF) since 2007.

Women's Doubles

 BWF Grand Prix Gold tournament
 BWF Grand Prix tournament

BWF International Challenge/Series (13 titles, 3 runners-up)
Women's Singles

Women's Doubles

Mixed Doubles

 BWF International Challenge tournament
 BWF International Series tournament
 BWF Future Series tournament

References

External links 
 

1988 births
Living people
Sportspeople from Ōita Prefecture
Japanese female badminton players
21st-century Japanese women